Mangudi may refer to:

Places in India
Mangudi, Lalgudi (Trichy district)
Mangudi (Thanjavur district)
Mangudi (Tirunelveli District)
Mangudi, Annavasal, Pudukkottai
Mangudi, Aranthangi, Pudukkottai
Mangudi-pudukottai

Other
Mangudi Minor, a 1978 Tamil film